Charron Lake is a freshwater body of the Lac-Ashuapmushuan, Quebec unorganized territory in the northwestern part of the Regional County Municipality (RCM) Le Domaine-du-Roy, in the administrative region of Saguenay-Lac-Saint-Jean, in province of Quebec, in Canada. This lake extends entirely in the canton of Charron.

Forestry is the main economic activity of the sector. Recreational tourism activities come second.

The forest road route 167 linking Chibougamau to Saint-Félicien, Quebec passes on the west shore of Charron Lake. The Canadian National Railway runs along this road.

The surface of Charron Lake is usually frozen from early November to mid-May, however, safe ice circulation is generally from mid-November to mid-April.

Geography

Toponymy
Formerly, this lake was designated "lac la Blanche" because of its extension to the north of the current "lac la Blanche" (English: White Lake). The term "Charron" is a family name of French origin.

The toponym "Lac Charron" was formalized on December 5, 1968, by the Commission de toponymie du Québec, i.e. at the creation of this commission.

Notes and references

See also 

Lakes of Saguenay–Lac-Saint-Jean
Le Domaine-du-Roy Regional County Municipality